Adela is a genus of the fairy longhorn moth family (Adelidae). Among these, it belongs to subfamily Adelinae.

Species

 Adela albicinctella Mann, 1852
 Adela australis (Herrich-Schäffer, 1855)
 Adela caeruleella Walker, 1863 – (southern longhorn moth)
 Adela collicolella (Walsingham, 1904)
 Adela croesella (Scopoli, 1763)
 Adela cuneella Walsingham, 1891
 Adela cuprella (Denis & Schiffermüller, 1775)
 Adela droseropa Meyrick, 1921
 Adela eldorada Powell, 1969
 Adela electella (Walker, 1863)
 Adela flammeusella Chambers, 1876
 Adela gymnota (Meyrick, 1912)
 Adela homalella (Staudinger, 1859)
 Adela janineae (Viette, 1954)
 Adela mazzolella (Hübner, 1801)
 Adela natalensis Stainton, 1860
 Adela oplerella Powell, 1969 (Opler's longhorn moth)
 Adela paludicolella (Zeller, 1850)
 Adela pantherellus (Guenée, 1848)
 Adela punctiferella Walsingham, 1870
 Adela purpurea Walker, 1863
 Adela reaumurella (Linnaeus, 1758) (green longhorn)
 Adela repetitella Mann, 1861
 Adela ridingsella Clemens, 1864 – (Ridings' fairy moth)
 Adela septentrionella Walsingham, 1880
 Adela singulella Walsingham, 1880
 Adela thorpella Powell, 1969
 Adela trigrapha Zeller, 1876
 Adela tsaratanana (Viette, 1954)
 Adela violella (Denis & Schiffermüller, 1775)

External links
 
 Adela at funet

Adelidae
Adeloidea genera
Taxa named by Pierre André Latreille